Breuillet is a commune in the Essonne department in Île-de-France in northern France.

It is located between Arpajon and Dourdan.

Population
Inhabitants of Breuillet are known as Breuilletois in French.

Twin towns
Breuillet has town twinning and cooperation agreement with:
   Ammanford, Wales.

See also
Communes of the Essonne department

References

External links

Official website 
Mayors of Essonne Association 

Communes of Essonne